Tinkler may refer to:

Alf Tinkler (1887–1950), English professional footballer who played as a centre-half
Andrew Tinkler, Chief Executive Officer of the Stobart Group Limited
Cole Tinkler (born 1986), New Zealand football (soccer) player
Eric Tinkler (born 1970), retired South African footballer
Jack Tinkler, former football (soccer) player who represented New Zealand at international level
Jamie Tinkler (born 1981), English singer
Mark Tinkler (born 1974), English footballer, currently playing for Whitby Town
Nathan Tinkler, Australian mining magnate
Ray Tinkler, English football referee from Boston, Lincolnshire
Robert Tinkler (born 1973), Canadian actor and television actor
Scott Tinkler (born 1965), Australian trumpeter and composer
Ted Tinkler (born 1921), former English cricketer
Wilbert James Tinkler, farmer and politician in Manitoba, Canada

See also
The Tinklers
Tink (disambiguation), including surname uses
Tinkle (surname)